Moray Robin Philip Adrian Watson (25 June 1928 – 2 May 2017) was an English actor from Sunningdale, Berkshire.

Life
Watson was born in Sunningdale, Berkshire, to Gerard Arthur Watson (1901–1940), a ship broker, who was killed during World War II at Anzegem in Belgium as a Captain in the Royal Sussex Regiment, and Jean, née McFarlane. His two elder brothers - the younger being J. N. P. Watson (1927-2008), author, hunting correspondent for Country Life magazine and formerly polo correspondent for The Times) - were Majors in the British Army. He was educated at Eton College. He met his future wife Pam, daughter of silent film star Percy Marmont, at The Webber Douglas Academy of Dramatic Art. They went on to marry in 1955 and had two children, Emma in 1957 and Robin in 1959, both of whom went into the theatre.

Career
Watson made his first appearance on stage while still a student at the Webber Douglas Academy of Dramatic Art at a matinee performance in memory of Ellen Terry at Hythe, Kent. After appearances in repertory, he appeared on the West End stage, including The Doctor's Dilemma and in The Rivals by Sheridan both at the Haymarket Theatre.

In 1963, he went to New York City to appear in The Private Ear and The Public Eye. He played the part of the Art Editor in the BBC series Compact for some years.

He appeared in several films, including Operation Crossbow and The Grass Is Greener, in which he played opposite Cary Grant, Deborah Kerr, Robert Mitchum and Jean Simmons.

Watson had a series of television credits to his name, most notably as Brigadier Arthur Maiford, MC (ret.) (but always known to the Larkins as "The General") in The Darling Buds of May (1991–1993); and George Frobisher in Rumpole of the Bailey (1978–1992). He also appeared as Sir Robert Muir in the Doctor Who story Black Orchid; and had a small role in Yes Minister. He also appeared in the 1974 version of The Pallisers as Barrington Erle and in the Albert Campion mystery The Case of the Late Pig as the Chief Constable. He also played a Chief constable in the 1977 BBC series Murder Most English and Mr Bennet in the 1980 BBC series Pride and Prejudice.

In addition to his long career on stage, television and film Moray Watson undertook three one-man shows. The first in the 1970s was The Incomparable Max based on the life and work of Max Beerbohm, written for him by Sheila Ward and Peter Ling. Years later in the early 2000s he took on Ancestral Voices, based on the diaries of James Lees Milne written by Hugh Massingberd. His final one-man show was written and devised by himself based on his own life as an actor, entitled Looking Back and Dropping Names, which was published in book form in September 2016. Watson died at the age of 88 on 2 May 2017.

Partial TV and filmography

 The Quatermass Experiment (1953, TV Series) as Peter Marsh
 Find the Lady (1956) as Jimmy
 No Wreath for the General (1960, TV Series) as Major Johnny Brookman
 The Grass Is Greener (1960) as Trevor Sellers, the Butler
 The Valiant (1962) as Captain Turnbull
 Compact (1962-1965, TV Series) as Richard Lowe
 Silas Marner (1964, TV Series) as Godfrey Cass
 The Saint (1964, TV Series) as Ken Shield
 Operation Crossbow (1965) as Colonel Kenneth Post
 The Avengers (1966, TV Series) as Peters
 Z-Cars (1969, TV Series) as Harold Thorburn
 Every Home Should Have One (1970) as Chandler
 Rookery Nook (1970, TV Movie) as Clive Popkiss
 Catweazle (1971, TV Series) as Lord Collingford
 Upstairs, Downstairs (1972, TV Series) as Colonel Winter
 The Pallisers (1974, TV Mini-Series) as Barrington Erle
 Quiller (1975, TV Series) as Angus Kinloch
 Murder Most English (1977, TV Series) as Chief Constable Chubb
 Life of Shakespeare (1978, TV Mini-Series) as Nicholas
 Return of the Saint (1978, TV Series) as Buckingham
 Rumpole of the Bailey (1978–1992, TV Series) as George Frobisher
 Pride and Prejudice (1980, TV Mini-Series) as Mr. Bennet
 The Sea Wolves (1980) as Breene
 The Professionals (1980, TV Series) as Jeremy Sangster
 Nobody's Perfect (1980–1982, TV Series) as  Henry Armstrong
 Winston Churchill: The Wilderness Years (1981, TV Mini-Series) as Major Desmond Morton
 The Walls of Jericho (1981, TV Mini-Series) as Dr. George Balfour
 Doctor Who (1982, TV Series - Black Orchid) as Sir Robert Muir
 Union Castle (1982, TV series) - Wordsworth
 Tales of the Unexpected (1982, TV Series) as Sir Ian Masterson
 Yes Minister (1982, TV Series - The Challenge) as BBC Director of Policy
 Minder (1984, TV Series) as Commander Hawksly
 Miss Marple (1984, TV Mini-Series - The Body in the Library) as Colonel Bantry
 Who Dares Wins (1986, TV Series)
 Still Crazy like a Fox (1987, TV Movie) as Hubbard
 Worlds Beyond (1987, TV Series) as Roger Cranley
 Rude Health (1987, TV Series) as Sir Nigel Toft
 Star Cops (1987, TV Series) as Commander
 Campion - "The Case of the Late Pig" (1989, TV Series) as Sir Leo Pursuivant
 Norbert Smith: A Life (1989, TV Movie) as Sir Donald Stuffy
 The New Statesman (1991, TV Series) as Professor Eugene Quail
 The House of Eliott (1991, TV Series) as The Judge
 A Murder of Quality (1991, TV Movie) as Major Harriman
 The Darling Buds of May (1991-1993, TV Series) as Brigadier
 To Be the Best (1992, TV Movie) as Hunter
 Haggard (1992, TV Series) as Henry Nugent
 The Vicar of Dibley (1994, TV Series) as The Stranger
 Kavanagh QC (1999, TV Series) as Sir Henry Dorrister
 Midsomer Murders (2000, TV Series) as Edward Allardice
 Bertie and Elizabeth (2002, TV Movie) as Lord Dawson
 My Family (2011, TV Series) as George
 Run for Your Wife (2012) as Man on the Bus

Publications
 Looking Back and Dropping Names An autobiography, published in September 2016.

References

External links
 
 Moray Watson(Aveleyman)

1928 births
2017 deaths
English male stage actors
English male television actors
English male film actors
People educated at Eton College
People from Sunningdale